Lego DC Batman: Family Matters is a 2019 American computer-animated superhero comedy film. It is a superhero action-adventure comedy based on the DC Comics and Lego brands produced by DC Entertainment, The Lego Group and Warner Bros. Animation, and distributed by Warner Bros. Home Entertainment, it premiered at the San Diego Comic-Con on July 21, 2019 and was released on DVD, Blu-ray and Digital on August 20, 2019. It is the ninth Lego DC Comics film. The DVD release includes a free 84-piece LEGO set. The film received positive reviews, with praise for the humor and action, although the consumerism was criticized.

Plot

After recently foiling the schemes of Solomon Grundy, Batman heads off to his company Wayne Enterprises in his civilian identity where his employees discuss a new AI system named Brother Eye. While Bruce likes the idea of the system's OMAC drones doing work for others, he later dismisses the system as he goes home.

Being bored throughout the meeting and believing that time in his civilian identity cuts out time as a vigilante, Batman decides to sell Wayne Enterprises. This news is discovered by Two-Face, who teams up with Red Hood to get revenge on Batman and Bruce Wayne (as Two-Face is unaware that they are one and the same) in order to increase his villainous reputation and in part due to Bruce frequently overshadowing him before his transformation.

Returning home, Batman receives a message to meet at a particular alleyway in Gotham, a message also received by Nightwing, Batgirl and Batwoman. Batman agrees to this message with Robin eventually joining in with the rest of the Bat Family, despite Batman's demands.

After being ambushed by and defeating Red Hood's robotic minions, Red Hood reveals that he is aware of the Bat-Family's secret identities and announces that he has placed 5 bombs across Gotham, one of which will only be revealed if the rest are disarmed. The Bat Family split up to disarm the bombs, with Nightwing taking Robin with him and telling Batman not to be so overprotective of Robin.

Batwoman disarms a bomb located at GCPD while facing off against Killer Croc, Batgirl finds a bomb at the Fairgrounds guarded by Scarecrow, and Nightwing and Robin battle Penguin and Riddler in a railway yard. All of them succeed in defeating their respective opponents. Upon doing so, they are stunned and apprehended by Red Hood one by one.

Batman eventually arrives at his destination, the Monarch theatre. There, he meets Billy Batson, an orphan whose orphanage is experiencing financial problems and was hoping to have Bruce appear on his podcast to solve them. At that moment, Two-Face shows up and reveals the fourth bomb. As Batman fights off against Two-Face, Billy manages to disarm the bomb with help from an unknown individual. Two-Face is defeated but he manages to escape. Batman is then told by Red Hood to return to the Batcave.

At the Batcave, Batman is able to deduce that Red Hood is his former protege Jason Todd, who left after believing that Batman did not care for him, which is technically true because Batman has proven to care more about fighting crime than the people he loves. Batman apologizes and then reveals that after Jason left, he proceeded to look for him until the Batcomputer lost track of him. Accepting Batman's apology, Red Hood releases the rest of the Bat Family, apologizes for his actions, and reveals that the bombs merely just exploded into confetti and that there was no fifth bomb. However, their reunion is cut short when Two-Face informs via video that he bought Wayne Enterprises and proceeds to cause havoc and unleash the OMAC drones through Gotham. He then demands to see Batman and Bruce Wayne to exact his revenge, threatening to use Brother Eye to destroy the city if they do not show up. Batman heads off to face Two-Face while the rest of the Bat-Family (minus Red Hood) goes fend off the OMAC drones.

At Wayne Industries, Batman struggles to keep his dual identity a secret until Red Hood arrives disguised as him. As Red Hood is locked inside the OMAC factory and faces off against Brother Eye, Batman (in his civilian identity) manages to face off against Two-Face and defeat him while apologizing for overshadowing him.

Meanwhile, the rest of the Bat Family is initially overwhelmed by the OMAC drones until Robin gains the idea to combine their vehicles, allowing them to gain an advantage. Red Hood manages to outwit Brother Eye and trick him into cutting off his power supply, shutting down the OMACs and causing the Brother Eye satellite to fall out of orbit only for it to be destroyed by the Bat Family.

Having dealt with Two-Face, Batman joins Red Hood in the OMAC factory and the two reconcile until Brother Eye begins to draw power from Wayne Enterprises power core and attempts to blow it up. When Brother Eye denies Batman's request to stop, bringing up Bruce's earlier dismissal of him, Batman apologizes and admits that he failed to see the good Wayne Enterprises was doing to Gotham. Batman states that he should be more open to other people, rather than pushing them away, realizing that doing so caused Jason to go rogue. Moved by Batman's words, Brother Eye shuts down and halts his attempt to blow up the power core.

Following this, Batman decides to be more considerate towards his proteges. Red Hood moves back into the Batcave and the Bat Family celebrate their victory as Batman and Red Hood bond over video games.

In a mid-credit scene with Bruce having regained ownership of Wayne Enterprises, Billy's orphanage is saved from financial crisis. As Billy is handing out flyers, one of them gets blown away in the wind. Billy follows it into a subway station, where he finds a bizarre-looking train arrive. The same individual from earlier tells Billy to board the train for the journey of a lifetime, to which Billy agrees.

Cast

Reception

Lego DC Batman: Family Matters earned $373,527 from domestic DVD sales and $257,140 from domestic Blu-ray sales, bringing its total domestic home video earnings to $630,667.

References

External links
 
 

2019 direct-to-video films
2019 animated films
Warner Bros. direct-to-video films
Lego Batman films
Films about sentient toys
Direct-to-video animated films based on DC Comics
2010s superhero comedy films
Films set in 2019
Animated films based on video games
2010s American animated films
American direct-to-video films
2010s direct-to-video animated superhero films
Warner Bros. direct-to-video animated films
Films directed by Matt Peters
2010s English-language films